Essiet Okon Essiet (born September 1, 1956 in Omaha, Nebraska) is an American jazz double-bassist.

Essiet's parents were Nigerian immigrants to the United States. He studied violin, as a child, then learned both bass guitar and stand-up bass as a high schooler in Portland Oregon. After attending Mount Hood Community College, he played briefly in Los Angeles, then worked in Europe in the early 1980s with Famoudou Don Moye. In 1983 he moved to New York City, playing with Abdullah Ibrahim, Art Blakey, Marty Cook, and Ralph Peterson, Jr. 

Subsequent associations include performing or recording with George Adams, Ron Affif, Kenny Barron, the Blue Note All-Stars, Paul Bollenback, Donald Brown, Bruce Cox, Kurt Elling, Kenny Garrett, Benny Golson, Jim Hartog, David Hazeltine, Freddie Hubbard, Victor Jones, Joe Locke, Kevin Mahogany, Cedar Walton, and Bobby Watson. 

He is the leader of the group "Intercontinental Bush Orchestra", founded in 1995. Official website of Essiet Okon Essiet

Discography

With Bluesiana Triangle (Dr. John and David "Fathead" Newman)
Bluesiana Triangle (Windham Hill, 1990)
Bluesiana II (Windham Hill, 1991)
With George Cables
My Muse (HighNote, 2012)
In Good Company (HighNote, 2015)
The George Cables Songbook (HighNote, 2016)
With Vincent Herring
Ends and Means (HighNote, 2006)
With Frank Morgan
Reflections (HighNote, 2006)

References 

American jazz double-bassists
Male double-bassists
Mt. Hood Community College alumni
Musicians from Portland, Oregon
Jazz musicians from Nebraska
American male jazz musicians
1956 births
Living people